The Slovakia men's national volleyball team represents Slovakia in international volleyball competitions and friendly matches. It is governed by the Slovakian Volleyball Federation.

Competition record

European Championship
 Champions   Runners-up   Third place   Fourth place

European Games
 Champions   Runners-up   Third place   Fourth place

World League

European League

Current squad
The following is the Slovak roster in the 2017 Men's European Volleyball Championship.

See also
Czechoslovakia men's national volleyball team
Slovakia women's national volleyball team

References

External links
Official website
FIVB profile

National men's volleyball teams
V
Volleyball in Slovakia
Men's sport in Slovakia